The Greenbrier Classic was a golf tournament on the PGA Tour, held from 2010 to 2019 at The Old White at The Greenbrier in White Sulphur Springs, West Virginia. For its final two editions, the tournament was titled A Military Tribute at the Greenbrier.

Course
Opened  in 1914, The Old White course joined the TPC network of courses in March 2011.

Old White TPC Course in 2018

History
The Greenbrier Classic made its debut in 2010 and replaced the long-standing Buick Open in Grand Blanc, Michigan, on the tour schedule. In the final round of the inaugural year, Stuart Appleby shot a 59 (the fifth in PGA Tour history) to win by one stroke. It was his first win on tour in four years.

Played in late July for its first two editions, The Greenbrier Classic moved to early July in 2012. Prior to the 2012 event, the original six-year contract with the PGA Tour was extended another six years, through 2021. The 2012 event was the first time Tiger Woods and Phil Mickelson both missed the cut in the same tournament.

Due to the effects of severe flooding in June 2016, that year's tournament was cancelled. 

In 2018, the event was renamed A Military Tribute at The Greenbrier, in honor of U.S. military involvement at the Greenbrier site (such as its use as a military hospital during World War II, and Project Greek Island).

As part of major changes to the PGA Tour schedule, the event moved to September in 2019. Since the season began in the fall, the event skipped the 2018–19 season and was the first event of the 2019–20 season. It was announced in April 2020 that, due in part to decreased attendance in its September date making the tournament less appealing to sponsors, the event would not return and the remainder of the contract with the tour had been cancelled by mutual agreement.

Winners

References

External links

Coverage on PGA Tour's official site
The Greenbrier's official site

Former PGA Tour events
Golf in West Virginia
The Greenbrier
Recurring sporting events established in 2010
Recurring sporting events disestablished in 2019
2010 establishments in West Virginia
2019 disestablishments in West Virginia